Richard Fairhust is a British jazz pianist. He studied jazz piano at the New School of Music, New York. He is sponsored by Steinway & Sons.

In 1998, he released "Formic" with his band Hungry Ants.

In 2004, he won the Best Work category of BBC Jazz Awards.

In 2012, he released "Postcards from Pushkin" with trumpet player [Tom Arthurs].

In 2015, he recorded a piano duo album with fellow British jazz pianist John Taylor (jazz).

Album Reviews
Review
Amusia album review
BBC review of Amusia
Irish Times review of Duets album
Jazzwise review of Duets album
Guardian review of Standing Tall album

Live Performance Reviews
Hungry Ants Review, The Guardian, 2003
FT review of Purcell Room performance
Viyay Iyer / Richard Fairhust at the Vortex July 8th 2010

References

External links
Richard Fairhurst Website
biography
Allmusic bio
Sam Leak and Richard Fairhurst duo performance 2011

British jazz pianists
Year of birth missing (living people)
Living people
Basho Records artists